Asian Institute of Digital Finance (AIDF) is a research institute to enhance education, research and entrepreneurship in digital finance.

History
AIDF is a collaboration between the Monetary Authority of Singapore, the National Research Foundation and the National University of Singapore (NUS) and was established in 2021.

Initiatives

Applied Research
The institute also concentrates on applied research in green finance and deep credit analysis to facilitate digital infrastructure for B2B digital finance development in Singapore.

Business Incubation
The institute also facilitates business incubation to acquire innovative fintech ideas from research and classroom studies for a wider business world.

External links 
 www.aidf.nus.edu.sg
 Speech at the launch of Asian Institute of Digital Finance by Heng Swee Keat, Deputy Prime Minister of Singapore

References 

National University of Singapore
Educational institutions established in 2021
Education in Singapore
2021 establishments in Singapore